The  Asian Baseball Championship was the ninth continental tournament held by the Baseball Federation of Asia. The tournament was held in Seoul, South Korea for the second time, and was won by the hosts for their second Asian Championship; both times when hosting the tournament.

The tournament marked the first time the Australian team participated in the Asian Championships—or in any international tournament—finishing 4th. Through , the Philippines' bronze medal would be the last time they would achieve a medal in the tournament. Japan (2nd) and Taiwan (5th) were the other participants.

References

Bibliography 
 

1971
1971
Asian Baseball Championship
1971 in South Korean sport
Asian Baseball Championship
Asian Baseball Championship
1970s in Seoul
Sports competitions in Seoul